Simon Aleyn (or Alleyn; died 17 October 1565) was a Canon of Windsor from 1559–63

He was educated in Oxford and graduated BA 1539, MA 1542.

He was appointed:
Vicar of Cookham 1553
Vicar of Strathfieldsaye 1559

He was also Vicar of St Michael's Church, Bray, Berkshire and, according to Thomas Fuller and Richard Brome, is the likely subject of the famous ballad, "The Vicar of Bray".  He was also thought to be the subject of a subsequent comic opera of the same name (written by Sydney Grundy, with music by Edward Solomon), but that opera makes no mention of Aleyn, and its text indicates that the character is actually vicar of Stanford-on-Avon and attached to the Lords of Bray whose family seat is at Stanford Hall.  Mention of the Pychley and Quorn hunts places the opera solidly on the borders of Northamptonshire and Leicestershire.

In legend, Aleyn retained his benefice (c. 1540 to 1588) during the reigns of Henry VIII, Edward VI, Mary and Elizabeth, he is said to have been successively Catholic, Protestant, Catholic, and Protestant in order to fulfil his principle. 
And this is law, I will maintain 
Unto my Dying Day, Sir. 
That whatsoever King may reign,
I will be the Vicar of Bray, Sir!

However, in reality Aleyn was only Vicar of Bray from 1557 to 1565.

His date of death is disputable since it appears to be 1563 in Fasti Wyndsorienses, but is given as 1565 in the online clergy database.

References

Canons of Windsor
1565 deaths
Year of birth missing
16th-century English Anglican priests